Touch was a 1960s American progressive rock band who recorded one album, 1968's eponymous Touch.  They consisted of John Bordonaro (drums, percussion, vocals), Don Gallucci (keyboards, vocals), Bruce Hauser (bass, vocals), Jeff Hawks (vocals), and Joey Newman AKA Vern Kjellberg (guitar, vocals).

History
After leaving The Kingsmen, Gallucci founded Don and the Goodtimes with drummer Bob Holden. An early version of the band included Jack Ely. They had a No. 20 pop hit in the US with "I Could Be So Good to You," produced and arranged by the legendary Jack Nitzsche. By this time earlier Goodtimes members had been replaced by vocalist Jeff Hawks, guitarist Joey Newman and bassist/vocalist Ron "Buzz" Overman.

By the end of 1967, following the release of Sgt. Pepper's Lonely Hearts Club Band, the Goodtimes were beginning to feel like they were "just rearranging the deck chairs on the Titanic" and felt the need to move on. Accordingly Gallucci and Hawks wrote what the sleevenotes to the Eclectic Discs CD reissue of the album calls the "Lysergic soaked" epic "Seventy Five". Gallucci, Hawks and Newman teamed up with Hauser and Bordonaro, and they set themselves up in a Moorish-style castle in the Hollywood Hills where they set to work on writing the songs for the album.

After signing with Coliseum Records, but before recording Touch, the group recorded the music tracks for the Elyse Weinberg LP using the name "The Band of Thieves", after Elyse's song of the same name. Gene Shiveley engineered the sessions at Sunset Sound Recorders.

The Touch recordings took place in an almost party-like atmosphere with such musical luminaries from the world of rock and psychedelia as Mick Jagger, Grace Slick and Jimi Hendrix attending the recordings at Sunset Sound with Shiveley producing.

The band also released a single, "Miss Teach", both sides of which were taken from the album. The band folded soon after the release of the album for personal reasons.

In an article for Record Collector, Kris Needs wrote that Touch has gone on to be "regarded as a cornerstone" of American progressive rock, and noted its status as a valuable collector's item until its 2004 reissue on the label Eclectic. He added of the record:

Discography
Touch released only one album, named Touch

Original LP, 1968:

 "We Feel Fine" 4:41
 "Friendly Birds" 4:53
 "Miss Teach" 3:29
 "The Spiritual Death of Howard Greer" 8:52
 "Down at Circe's Place" 4:00
 "Alesha and Others" 3:05
 "Seventy Five" 11:12
Total time: 40:12

CD release in 2004, Eclectic Disks ECLCD 1005. Tracks 8-12 are bonus tracks:

 "We Feel Fine" 4:39
 "Friendly Birds" 4:51
 "Miss Teach" 3:29
 "The Spiritual Death of Howard Greer" 8:52
 "Down at Circe's Place" 3:59
 "Alesha and Others" 3:04
 "Seventy Five" 11:47
 "We Finally Met Today" (unreleased single 1968) 3:41
 "Alesha and Others" (live studio demo 1968) 3:14
 "Blue Feeling" 11:45
 "The Spiritual Death of Howard Greer" (live studio demo 1968) 8:07
 "The Second Coming of Suzanne" (film music 1973) 12:19
Total time: 79:22

Fruits de Mer Records issued a 7" vinyl single in 2018.

References

Musical groups established in 1968
American psychedelic rock music groups
Musical groups disestablished in 1968
Fruits de Mer Records artists